FC Florești  is a Moldovan football club based in Florești, Moldova. They played in the Moldovan National Division, the first tier of Moldovan football, in its most recent season, but were relegated after finishing 8th in the 2021-22 season. They will play in the Moldovan "A" Division in the 2022–23 season.

History
Florești were founded in 2002. They played in the third tier until they were promoted in 2017. In 2019, they were promoted to the top division. They spent two seasons in the first tier, before suffering relegation in the 2021–22 season.

Stadium
The club played their home matches at the Stadionul Izvoare in Florești before they were promoted to the top division, after which they played at the Dinamo Stadium in Bender.

Honours
Divizia A
 Winners: 2019

Divizia B
 Winners: 2017

Current squad

 (on loan from CSF Bălți)

 (on loan from Sheriff Tiraspol)

Recent seasons

References

External links
FC Florești on Soccerway.com

 
Football clubs in Moldova
Association football clubs established in 2002
2002 establishments in Moldova
Florești District